Lech Piasecki (born 13 November 1961) is a Polish former racing cyclist. Born  in Poznań, he became the first Polish cyclist to wear the yellow jersey in the Tour de France, in 1987.

After Piasecki became Amateur world champion in 1985, the Colnago team wanted to sign him. The Polish cycling organisation allowed that in exchange for bicycles. His first victory as a professional cyclist was in a time trial in the 1986 Giro d'Italia, where he beat many favourites.
In 1987, he won the first stage of the Tirreno–Adriatico. It was a time trial in which he started early, and the wind changed direction after Piasecki finished, so the main favourites who started later had a disadvantage. In the 1987 Tour de France, Piasecki became second in the prologue, and took the yellow jersey after finishing in the lead group of Stage 2. After he lost the lead on Stage 4, he had to abandon in the 7th stage due to an illness.
On August 24, 1988 he became World Track Champion in individual pursuit. The following year Piasecki put forth a remarkable performance during the 1989 Giro d'Italia by winning three stages including two ITT stages, as well as a high mountain stage.

Career achievements 

1982
1st Stage 7a, Milk Race
1983
 6th Overall Tour de Pologne
1st Stage 6 
1984
3rd Polish National Road Race Championships
1985
1st  UCI Road World Championships, Amateurs
1st Overall Peace Race
1st Stages 1, 7, 8 & 11
1986
1st Tour de Romagna
1st Florence-Pistoia
1st Stage 12 (ITT) Giro d'Italia
1st Stage 3, Tour de l'Aude
1st Trofeo Baracchi (with Giuseppe Saronni)
1987
1st Stage 1 Tirreno–Adriatico
1988
1st Stage 21b (ITT) Giro d'Italia
1st Trofeo Baracchi (with Czesław Lang)
1989
1st Tour de Friuli
1st Stage 7 Tirreno–Adriatico
Giro d'Italia
1st Stages 10 (ITT), 15b & 22 (ITT)
1990
1st Florence-Pistoia

Tour de France 
1987 Tour de France - did not finish. Wore yellow jersey for 2 consecutive days, the first and so far only Polish cyclist to do so.

References

1961 births
Living people
Polish male cyclists
Sportspeople from Poznań
UCI Track Cycling World Champions (men)
Polish track cyclists